Callum Francis Parkinson (born 24 October 1996) is an English cricketer who plays for Leicestershire. Primarily a slow left arm orthodox bowler, he bats right handed. He is the twin-brother of Lancashire and England spinner, Matt Parkinson.

On 17 September 2016, Parkinson rejected a new contract at Derbyshire and signed for Leicestershire ahead of the 2017 season. He made his List A debut for Leicestershire in the 2017 Royal London One-Day Cup on 16 May 2017. He made his Twenty20 debut for Leicestershire in the 2017 NatWest t20 Blast on 9 July 2017.

In April 2022, he was bought by the Northern Superchargers for the 2022 season of The Hundred.

References

External links
 
 

1996 births
Living people
English cricketers
People from Bolton
People educated at Bolton School
Derbyshire cricketers
Leicestershire cricketers
Staffordshire cricketers
Northern Superchargers cricketers